Hernando Siles is a province of the department of Chuquisaca, Bolivia. In the 2001 census it had a population of 36,511. It covers an area of 5,473 km², giving it a population density of 6.67/km². Its capital is Monteagudo.

Subdivision 
The province is divided into two municipalities which are further subdivided into cantons.

References

Provinces of Chuquisaca Department